Val IT is a governance framework that can be used to create business value from IT investments. It consists of a set of guiding principles and a number of processes and best practices that are further defined as a set of key management practices to support and help executive management and boards at an enterprise level. The latest release of the framework, published by IT Governance Institute (ITGI), based on the experience of global practitioners and academics, practices and methodologies was named Enterprise Value: Governance of IT Investments, The Val IT Framework 2.0. It covers processes and key management practices for three specific domains and goes beyond new investments to include IT services, assets, other resources and principles and processes for IT portfolio management.

Overview
Val IT allows business managers to get business value from IT investments, by providing a governance framework that consists of
 a set of guiding principles, and
 a number of processes conforming to those principles that are further defined as a set of key management practices.

The major domains are as follows:
 Value Governance (VG prefix)
 Portfolio Management (PM prefix)
 Investment Management (IM prefix)

Currently (as of 2006) a relatively short body of work, it will evolve and expand over time, with documents available for download via the Val IT Page at ISACA, and include:
 the framework itself;
 a template/guide to using Val IT when developing a business case;
 a case study; and
 FAQ

Relationship to COBIT
Val IT is tightly integrated with COBIT Version 4, also from the Information Systems Audit and Control Association (a.k.a. ISACA).  The Framework document explains the difference between COBIT and Val IT as follows:
Val IT extends and complements COBIT, which provides a comprehensive control framework for IT governance.  Specifically, Val IT focuses on the investment decision (are we doing the right things?) and the realisation of benefits (are we getting the benefits?), while COBIT focuses on the execution (are we doing them the right way, and are we getting them done well?)

COBIT Version 5 incorporates Val IT (and Risk IT) to its framework:
The COBIT 5 process reference model is the successor of the COBIT 4.1 process model, with the Risk IT and Val IT process models integrated as well.

Relationship to VMM
Value Measuring Methodology (VMM), which has the motto "it's not just about ROI any more", provides more specific guidance than Val IT about:
 the different types of value (tangible and intangible) that can be considered; and
 how to compare the "apples" (tangibles) with "oranges" (intangibles) from individual projects to help maintain balance.

Principles
 IT-enabled investments will be managed as a portfolio of investments.
 IT-enabled investments will include the full scope of activities that are required to achieve business value.
 IT-enabled investments will be managed through their full economic life cycle.
 Value delivery practices will recognize that there are different categories of investments that will be evaluated and managed differently.
 Value delivery practices will define and monitor key metrics and will respond quickly to any changes or deviations.
 Value delivery practices will engage all stakeholders and assign appropriate accountability for the delivery of capabilities and the realization of business benefits.
 Value delivery practices will be continually monitored, evaluated and improved.

Major Processes
Each of the following major processes/activities have a responsibility assignment (RACI) matrix, indicating the responsibilities of the senior executives, business managers, and information managers, along with the major and minor COBIT control objectives associated with the activity.

Value Governance
 VG1: Establish informed and committed leadership.
 VG2: Define and implement processes.
 VG3: Define portfolio characteristics.
 VG4: Align and integrate value management with enterprise financial planning.
 VG5: Establish effective governance monitoring.
 VG6: Continuously improve value management practices.

Portfolio Management
 PM1: Establish strategic direction and target investment mix.
 PM2: Determine the availability and sources of funds.
 PM3: Manage the availability of human resources.
 PM4: Evaluate and select programmes to fund.
 PM5: Monitor and report on investment portfolio performance.
 PM6: Optimise portfolio performance.

Investment Management
 IM1: Develop and evaluate the initial programme concept business case.
 IM2: Understand the candidate programme and implementation options.
 IM3: Develop the programme plan.
 IM4: Develop full life-cycle costs and benefits.
 IM5: Develop the detailed candidate programme business case.
 IM6: Launch and manage the programme.
 IM7: Update operational IT portfolios.
 IM8: Update the business case.
 IM9: Monitor and report on the programme.
 IM10: Retire the programme.

Use with other management domains
As with COBIT, Val IT can be adapted for use with many other domains that are yet to develop an engineering perspective, by either removing the phrases "Information Technology" and "IT-enabled", or replacing them with the name of your domain of interest (e.g. "Marketing"), and then "season to taste".

References
 The Val IT page at ISACA
 ISACA Val IT FAQ

See also
 Information Systems Audit and Control Association (ISACA) - Custodians of Val IT
 IT Governance
 IT Portfolio Management
 COBIT
 Risk management
 Earned value management
 Value networks
 Value network analysis
 Value theory
 Value Measuring Methodology - assessment of value from individual inititiatives

Information technology governance